Ankara bombing may refer to:

Ankara Esenboğa Airport attack in 1982
2007 Ankara bombing 
2011 Ankara bombing 
2013 United States embassy bombing in Ankara 
2015 Ankara bombings 
February 2016 Ankara bombing 
March 2016 Ankara bombing